Uncial 0174 (in the Gregory-Aland numbering), is a Greek uncial manuscript of the New Testament, dated paleographically to the 5th century.

Description 
The codex contains a very small part of the Epistle to the Galatians 2:5-6, on fragment of one parchment leaf (6 cm by 2.3 cm). The text is written in one column per page, 6 lines per page, in uncial letters. Verso side of a fragment is blank. 

Currently it is dated by the INTF to the 5th century.

The Greek text of this codex is unknown. Text is too brief to classify. Aland did not placed it in any of Categories of New Testament manuscripts. 

It was written in Egypt. It was found in Oxyrhynchos.

The codex currently is housed at the Laurentian Library (PSI 118) in Florence.

The text of this fragment was published by Ermenegildo Pistelli in 1913.

See also 

 List of New Testament uncials
 Textual criticism

References

Further reading 

 Publicazioni della Societa Italiana (Papiri Greci e Latini) II, 118, ed. G. Vitelli.
 Iginio Crisci, La collezione dei papiri di Firenze, p. 91. In: Proceedings of the 12th International Congress of Papyrology, Toronto 1970.

External links 
 Biblioteca Medicea Laurenziana

Greek New Testament uncials
5th-century biblical manuscripts